Jorge Eduardo Wright (20 April 1922 – 2005) was an Argentinian mycologist. Born in Buenos Aires, he graduated from the University of Buenos Aires in 1949. He was awarded a Latin American Guggenheim Fellowship and studied under Alexander H. Smith at the University of Michigan, under whom he received his Master of Science degree in botany in 1955. A year later he was awarded his doctorate from the University of Buenos Aires based on his research on the gasteromycetes and other basidiomycetes. Wright became a full professor in systematic botany at this university in 1960, a position he held until his retirement in 1988. During his career, he published over 120 scientific articles and several books.

In 1966, botanist Zdeněk Pouzar published a genus of fungi in the family Bondarzewiaceae, as Wrightoporia in Wright's honour.

References

1922 births
2005 deaths
Argentine mycologists
University of Buenos Aires alumni
Academic staff of the University of Buenos Aires
University of Michigan alumni
Argentine expatriates in the United States